William Atwood may refer to:
Bill Atwood (1911–1993), American baseball player
Bill Atwood (bishop), American bishop
Bill Atwood (musician), American musician
William Atwood (c. 1650–1712), English lawyer
William A. Atwood (1835–1908), American politician
William Q. Atwood (1839–1910), American businessman

See also
William Attwood (1919–1989), American journalist and diplomat